In mathematics, specifically in category theory, an exponential object or map object is the categorical generalization of a function space in set theory. Categories with all finite products and exponential objects are called cartesian closed categories. Categories (such as subcategories of Top) without adjoined products may still have an exponential law.

Definition

An object  together with a morphism  is an exponential object if for any object  and morphism  there is a unique morphism  (called the transpose of ) such that the following diagram commutes:

This assignment of a unique  to each  establishes an isomorphism (bijection) of hom-sets, 

Equational definition

Alternatively, the exponential object may be defined through equations:
 Commutativity of the diagrams above is guaranteed by the equality .

Universal property

The exponential  is given by a universal morphism from the product functor  to the object . This universal morphism consists of an object   and a morphism .

Examples

In the category of sets, an exponential object  is the set of all functions . For any map  the map  is the curried form of :

A Heyting algebra  is just a bounded lattice that has all exponential objects. The above adjunction results translate to implication being right adjoint to meet.

In the category of topological spaces, the exponential object  exists provided that  is a locally compact Hausdorff space. The evaluation map is the same as in the category of sets; it is continuous with the above topology. If  is not locally compact Hausdorff, the exponential object may not exist (the space  still exists, but it may fail to be an exponential object since the evaluation function need not be continuous). For this reason the category of topological spaces fails to be cartesian closed.
A cartesian closed category of spaces is, for example, given by the full subcategory spanned by the compactly generated Hausdorff spaces.

In functional programming languages, the morphism  is often  called , and the syntax  is often written . The morphism  here must not to be confused with the eval function in some programming languages, which evaluates quoted expressions.

See also
Closed monoidal category

Notes

References

External links 
Interactive Web page  which generates examples of exponential objects and other categorical constructions. Written by Jocelyn Paine.

Objects (category theory)